Battle of Le Havre may refer to:

 Raid on Le Havre in July 1759 during the Seven Years' War
 Operation Astonia in September 1944 during the Second World War